Prudencio Benavides (1870–??) was a Cuban baseball center fielder and manager in the Cuban League. He played with San Francisco from 1899 to 1901, with Club Fé in 1902 and 1905, and Alerta in 1905. He also managed Alerta in 1905 and Club Fé in 1908.

References

External links

1870 births
Cuban League players
Cuban baseball players
San Francisco (baseball) players
Club Fé players
Year of death unknown